The Tuxedni Formation is a geologic formation in Alaska. It preserves fossils dating back to the Jurassic period. An indeterminate ophthalmosaurid is known from the formation.

See also 
 List of fossiliferous stratigraphic units in Alaska
 Paleontology in Alaska

References

 

Geologic formations of Alaska
Jurassic System of North America
Bajocian Stage
Bathonian Stage